Dahiya is a surname of Indian origin. Notable people bearing this surname include: 

 Aakash Dahiya (born 1983), Mumbai-based actor and casting director
 Amit Kumar Dahiya (born 1983), Indian wrestler
 Babulal Dahiya (born 1949), Indian agriculturist
 Bhim S. Dahiya (born 1938), Indian academician and politician
 Dharan Singh Dahiya (born 1967), Indian olympian wrestler
 Hoshiar Singh Dahiya (1937–1998), officer of the Indian Army awarded Param Veer Chakra
 Jagbir Dahiya Indian film director and producer
 Jai Tirath Dahiya (born 1952), Indian politician
 Jat Mehar Singh Dahiya, Indian poet and freedom fighter
 Kushal Singh Dahiya, Martyr
 Nisha Dahiya (born 1998), Indian wrestler
 Padam Singh Dahiya (born 1963), Indian politician
 Parteek Dahiya (born 2002), Indian kabbadi player
 Preeti Dahiya (born 2004), Indian boxer
 Rajneesh Dahiya (born 1977), Indian Politician
 Rajvir Dahiya (born 1956), Indo-American scientist
 Ravi Kumar Dahiya (born 1999), Indian wrestler
 Rizak Ram Dahiya (born 1912), Minister
 Rohit Dahiya (born 1988), Indian cricketer
 Rohtas Singh Dahiya (born 1960), Wrestler
 Vijay Dahiya (born 1973), Indian cricketer
 Vikas Dahiya (born 1995), Indian field hockey goalkeeper
 Vinod Kumar Dahiya (born 1986), Indian-Australian Greco-Roman wrestler
 Virender Dahiya (born 1989), Indian cricketer
 Vivek Dahiya (born 1984), Indian television actor

See also
 Dahiya Khap

Indian surnames